Mi-Wuk Village is a census-designated place (CDP) in Tuolumne County, California, United States. The population was 941 at the 2010 census, down from 1,485 at the 2000 census. It was named after the Miwok Indians by the real estate developer and promoter Harry Hoeffler in 1955.

Geography
Mi-Wuk Village is located at  (38.061053, -120.187524).

According to the United States Census Bureau, the CDP has a total area of 2.8 square miles (7.2 km2), of which 99.80% is land and 0.20% is water.

Climate
This region experiences warm (but not hot) and dry summers, with no average monthly temperatures above 71.6 °F.  According to the Köppen Climate Classification system, Mi-Wuk Village has a warm-summer Mediterranean climate, abbreviated "Csb" on climate maps.

Demographics

2010
The 2010 United States Census reported that Mi-Wuk Village had a population of 941. The racial makeup of Mi-Wuk Village was 871 (92.6%) White, 5 (0.5%) African American, 17 (1.8%) Native American, 3 (0.3%) Asian, 0 (0.0%) Pacific Islander, 11 (1.2%) from other races, and 34 (3.6%) from two or more races. Hispanic or Latino of any race were 71 persons (7.5%).

The Census reported that 941 people (100% of the population) lived in households, 0 (0%) lived in non-institutionalized group quarters, and 0 (0%) were institutionalized.

There were 417 households, out of which 96 (23.0%) had children under the age of 18 living in them, 221 (53.0%) were opposite-sex married couples living together, 38 (9.1%) had a female householder with no husband present, 20 (4.8%) had a male householder with no wife present.  There were 26 (6.2%) unmarried opposite-sex partnerships, and 6 (1.4%) same-sex married couples or partnerships. 100 households (24.0%) were made up of individuals, and 47 (11.3%) had someone living alone who was 65 years of age or older. The average household size was 2.26.  There were 279 families (66.9% of all households); the average family size was 2.68.

The population was spread out, with 160 people (17.0%) under the age of 18, 61 people (6.5%) aged 18 to 24, 175 people (18.6%) aged 25 to 44, 343 people (36.5%) aged 45 to 64, and 202 people (21.5%) who were 65 years of age or older.  The median age was 50.9 years. For every 100 females, there were 104.1 males.  For every 100 females age 18 and over, there were 97.2 males.

The homeowner vacancy rate was 4.7%; the rental vacancy rate was 11.5%.  706 people (75.0% of the population) lived in owner-occupied housing units and 235 people (25.0%) lived in rental housing units.

2000
As of the census of 2000, there were 1,485 people, 601 households, and 430 families residing in the CDP. The racial makeup of the CDP was 92.53% White, 0.13% African American, 0.94% Native American, 0.40% Asian, 0.13% Pacific Islander, 1.55% from other races, and 4.31% from two or more races. Hispanic or Latino of any race were 6.33% of the population.

There were 601 households, out of which 28.8% had children under the age of 18 living with them, 61.2% were married couples living together, 6.3% had a female householder with no husband present, and 28.3% were non-families. 22.5% of all households were made up of individuals, and 8.0% had someone living alone who was 65 years of age or older.  The average household size was 2.47 and the average family size was 2.86.

In the CDP the population was spread out, with 23.9% under the age of 18, 6.3% from 18 to 24, 20.7% from 25 to 44, 31.5% from 45 to 64, and 17.6% who were 65 years of age or older.  The median age was 44 years. For every 100 females, there were 100.4 males.  For every 100 females age 18 and over, there were 99.6 males.

The median income for a household in the CDP was $51,925, and the median income for a family was $52,019. Males had a median income of $43,750 versus $26,071 for females. The per capita income for the CDP was $26,209.  About 5.9% of families and 8.8% of the population were below the poverty line, including 9.9% of those under age 18 and none of those age 65 or over.

Government

See also 

References

External links
 Mi-Wuk Village Weather Station

Census-designated places in Tuolumne County, California
Populated places in the Sierra Nevada (United States)